The Dana 44 is an automotive axle manufactured by Dana Holding Corporation and is used among automobile manufacturers and in the automotive aftermarket area as well.

Automotive engineering
Automobile axles